Kut-e Seyyed may refer to one of these places in Khuzestan Province, Iran:
 Kut-e Seyyed (Khorramshahr County)
 Kut-e Seyyed Enayat (Bavi County)
 Kut-e Seyyed Naim (Dasht-e Azadegan County)
 Kut-e Seyyed Saleh (Karun County)
 Kut-e Seyyed Sharif (Bavi County)
 Kut-e Seyyed Soltan (Bavi County)